Brock Hoffman (born July 2, 1999) is an American football center for the Dallas Cowboys of the National Football League (NFL). He played college football at Coastal Carolina and Virginia Tech.

Professional career

Cleveland Browns
After going undrafted in the 2022 NFL draft, Hoffman signed with the Cleveland Browns as a priority free agent in April 2022. He was released from the practice squad on November 7, 2022.

Dallas Cowboys
On November 16, 2022, Hoffman was signed to the Dallas Cowboys practice squad. He signed a reserve/future contract on January 23, 2023.

References

External links
Dallas Cowboys bio
Virginia Tech Hokies bio
Coastal Carolina Chanticleers bio

1999 births
Living people
American football centers
Cleveland Browns players
Dallas Cowboys players
Coastal Carolina Chanticleers football players
Virginia Tech Hokies football players